Catherine "Kathy" Laverne McMillan (born November 7, 1957) is a retired American athlete, who mainly competed in the long jump.

McMillan was born in Raeford, North Carolina. She competed for the United States at the 1976 Summer Olympics held in Montreal, Canada, where she won the silver medal in the Women's Long Jump event as an 18-year-old. She attended Tennessee State University.

While competing for Hoke County High School, in Raeford, North Carolina she set the still standing NFHS National High School Record in the Long Jump of  while participating in the Jack in the Box Invitational at UCLA on June 12, 1976.

McMillan qualified for the 1980 US Olympic team but was unable to compete due to the 1980 Summer Olympics boycott. She did however receive one of 461 Congressional Gold Medals created especially for the spurned athletes.

In 2021 she was elected into the National Track and Field Hall of Fame.

References

External links
 
 
 McMillan at the 1976 US. Olympic Trials  @ 27:00

1957 births
Living people
People from Raeford, North Carolina
Tennessee State Lady Tigers track and field athletes
Olympic silver medalists for the United States in track and field
Athletes (track and field) at the 1975 Pan American Games
Athletes (track and field) at the 1976 Summer Olympics
Athletes (track and field) at the 1979 Pan American Games
Athletes (track and field) at the 1983 Pan American Games
Track and field athletes from North Carolina
American female long jumpers
Medalists at the 1976 Summer Olympics
Pan American Games gold medalists for the United States
Pan American Games medalists in athletics (track and field)
Congressional Gold Medal recipients
Medalists at the 1975 Pan American Games
Medalists at the 1979 Pan American Games
Medalists at the 1983 Pan American Games